William Miller Kyle (December 23, 1924 – April 17, 1968) was a Canadian professional ice hockey player who played three games in the National Hockey League, with the New York Rangers during the 1949–50 and 1950–51 seasons. The rest of his career, which lasted from 1945 to 1961, was spent in various minor leagues.

Kyle is also NHL record holder for the best single season points per game average with 3.00 in 1950–51, scoring 3 points in his one game that season. Richard Kromm equaled the record in the 1992–93 season, also achieved in a single game. Bill's brother of Gus Kyle also played in the NHL..

Career statistics

Regular season and playoffs

References
 

1924 births
1968 deaths
Brandon Regals players
Canadian expatriate ice hockey players in the United States
Canadian ice hockey centres
Ice hockey people from Saskatchewan
New York Rangers players
New York Rovers players
Portland Eagles players